Fat is an oily or greasy organic substance.

Fat or FAT may also refer to:

Arts and entertainment

Literature
 Fat (novel), by Rob Grant
 "Fat", a short story by Raymond Carver from the collection Will You Please Be Quiet, Please?

Music
 Fat (EP), by American punk rock band the Descendents
 "Fat" (song), a parody of Michael Jackson's "Bad" by Weird Al Yankovic
 "Fat", a song by Violent Femmes from the album 3
 "Fat", a song by Lindemann from the album Skills in Pills

Television
 "Fat" (Law & Order: Special Victims Unit), an episode in season 7 of Law & Order: Special Victims Unit
 The Fat, a former Australian television sports talk show

Other uses in arts and entertainment
 Fat (film), a 2013 indie drama film
 Wo Fat, Steve McGarrett's archenemy in the television series Hawaii Five-O
 Fashion Architecture Taste, an art and architecture collective based in London

Military
 FAT (torpedo), a type of torpedo used by Germany during World War II
 Field Artillery Tractor, a vehicle for towing field artillery
 , the armed forces of the country of Chad

People
 Fan Fat, the king of Champa (in what is now Vietnam) from 349 to 380
 Lafayette Fat Lever (born 1960), an American National Basketball Association player
 Ralph Waldsmith (1892-1925), an American football player in the early days of the National Football League, nicknamed "Fat"
 Andrew Wong (politician) (born 1943), a politician known in Hong Kong as "Uncle Fat" (full name Andrew Wong Wang Fat)

Acronym 
 Factory acceptance testing, acceptance testing prior to installation
 Far Eastern Air Transport, an airline on Taiwan
  (Authentic Labor Front), a Mexican labor confederation
 File Allocation Table (FAT file system and its variants FAT12, FAT16 and FAT32), a computer file system architecture and a family of file systems utilizing it
 Football Association of Thailand, the governing body of football in Thailand
 Fully automatic time, a method of recording times during running events

Other uses
 Fath, Iran, a village also known as "Fāt"
 Fat (cookbook), by Jennifer McLagan
 FAT (gene), which encodes the protein protocadherin FAT1
 FAT, ISO 639-2 and 639-3 codes for the Fante dialect (Mfantse, Fanti), a formal language (literary dialect) of the Akan language
 FAT, IATA code for Fresno Yosemite International Airport, California
 Obesity
 Overweight

Related uses
 Fat address
 Fat binary, a multi-platform (executable) file in computing
 Fat hex
 Fat link, a multi-tailed hyperlink
 Fat node
 Fat object (disambiguation)
 Fat pointer, a special type of pointer in some programming languages
 Fat shellcode

See also
 List of people known as the Fat
 Free Art and Technology Lab or F.A.T. Lab, a New York-based artist group
 Fats (disambiguation)
 Fatty (disambiguation)
 Phat (disambiguation)
 Gordo (disambiguation), the Spanish and Portuguese word for "fat"

Lists of people by nickname